FC Peresvet Domodedovo is a Russian football team. It was originally licensed in the 2021–22 season as based in Podolsk, but played their home games in Domodedovo. It was licensed for the third-tier Russian for the 2021–22 season.

Current squad
As of 22 February 2023, according to the Second League website.

References

Association football clubs established in 2016
Football clubs in Russia
Football in Moscow Oblast
2016 establishments in Russia